Conturbatia is a genus of air-breathing land snail in the family Streptaxidae. It is monotypic, being represented by the single species Conturbatia crenata in the family Streptaxidae. It is a species of air-breathing land snail, a terrestrial pulmonate gastropod mollusk.

Conturbatia crenata is possibly extinct. The last record of this species alive was in 2000. It is thought, that the population of Conturbatia crenata has been poisoned with rodenticide Brodifacoum in 2000.

Distribution 
Conturbatia crenata is endemic to the Frégate Island in the Seychelles.

Description 
Conturbatia crenata has reduced radula.

Ecology 
Conturbatia crenata lives in woodland areas with Pterocarpus indicus, also known as the New Guinea Rosewood tree. It inhabits leaf litter and habitats with dead wood.

Conturbatia crenata feeds on carrion.

References

Streptaxidae